The Mazhilis of the Parliament of the Republic of Kazakhstan of the 4th convocation was the legislative term of the lower house of the Parliament of Kazakhstan. It existed from 2 September 2007 to 16 November 2011 when it was dissolved to make way for the snap legislative election which formed the 5th Mazhilis. This was the only convocation that where the ruling party Nur Otan held all the directly elected seats due to other parties not passing the 7% threshold.

The 4th Mazhilis term started after the 2007 Kazakh legislative election where its predecessor 3rd Mazhilis was dissolved on 20 June 2007. This was the first election where all the seats where to be allocated through proportional representation, while the 9 seats are reserved to the indirectly elected members of the Assembly of People due to the 2007 amendment to the Constitution of Kazakhstan.

Structure

References 

Convocations of the Mazhilis